Ramiro Martínez (born 22 July 1995) is an Argentine handball player for Balonmano Benidorm and the Argentine national team.

He represented Argentina at the 2019 World Men's Handball Championship.

References

1995 births
Living people
Argentine male handball players
Expatriate handball players
Argentine expatriate sportspeople in Spain
Handball players at the 2020 Summer Olympics
21st-century Argentine people